is a Japanese manga series written and illustrated by Norihiro Yagi. It was serialized in Shogakukan's  shōnen manga magazine Weekly Shōnen Sunday from December 2017 to September 2022, before being transferred to the online platform Sunday Webry; its chapters have been collected in twenty-two tankōbon volumes as of March 2023.

Synopsis
The story centers around a certain boy who lives alone away from people, but harbors a special dream. One day, he meets a lone girl, and the story begins as he becomes part of the girl's destiny.

Publication
Ariadne in the Blue Sky, written and illustrated by Norihiro Yagi, was announced in October 2017. It was serialized in Shogakukan's shōnen manga magazine Weekly Shōnen Sunday from December 6, 2017, to September 14, 2022. The manga was transferred to Shogakukan's online platform Sunday Webry on September 29, 2022, and finished on February 9, 2023. The first tankōbon volume was published by Shogakukan on April 18, 2018. As of March 16, 2023, twenty-two volumes have been released. The series ended with the release of its twenty-second volume.

The series has been licensed in France by Glénat and in Italy by Star Comics.

Volume list

References

External links
 

Adventure anime and manga
Fantasy anime and manga
Shogakukan manga
Shōnen manga